City Slam (also known as ESPN City Slam) is an ESPN television series that premiered in 2005.  The show is a basketball competition featuring streetball players competing in a slam dunk and three-point shooting contest.
This show is hosted by Dee Brown, himself a 1991 NBA slam Dunk Champion.

2008 City Slam
City Slam returned to ESPN in 2008. The event took place in Chicago on August 9, 2008 and aired on ESPN August 14, 2008. Dee Brown returned as host.

Contestants:
Above and Beyond,
Air Bama,
Elevator,
Exile,
Fabian Gresier,
Guy Dupuy,
Golden Child,
High Rizer,
JustFly,
KD,
Special FX,
Tdub,
Tfly, and
Werm.

References 

ESPN original programming
Basketball on television in the United States
2005 American television series debuts
2008 American television series endings
Streetball